Colfax is an unincorporated community in Marion County, West Virginia, United States. Colfax has a post office with ZIP code 26566.

References

Unincorporated communities in Marion County, West Virginia
Unincorporated communities in West Virginia